Euretaster is a genus of echinoderms belonging to the family Pterasteridae.

The species of this genus are found in Indian and Pacific Ocean.

Species:

Euretaster attenuatus 
Euretaster cribrosus 
Euretaster insignis

References

Pterasteridae
Echinoderm genera